Toni Fiore is an American TV host, cookbook author, and chef, focusing on vegetarian and vegan dishes.

Biography 
Fiore was born to an Italian-American father and a German mother, and spent her teens and 20s in Italy. Fiore is a self-taught chef and she lives in Cumberland, Maine.

Career 
Fiore hosts the TV shows Totally Vegetarian and Vegan Mashup, where she joins co-hosts cookbook author Terry Hope Romero and vegan cheese entrepreneur Miyoko Schinner. Both shows air on PBS and PBS Create stations across the United States; on the Roku Plant-Based Network and on other streaming platforms. In 2008, Da Capo Lifelong Books published Totally Vegetarian: Easy, Fast, Comforting Cooking for Every Kind of Vegetarian, by Fiore.

Filming on Totally Vegetarian began in 2002 at the cable access station in Portland, Maine before it was picked up by PBS; 52 episodes were produced. Fiore began filming Vegan Mashup in 2012, and guest chefs on the show have included Bryant Terry, Colleen Patrick-Goudreau, Girl Gone Raw Elizabeth Fraser, and Cathi DiCocco.

Between 2008 and 2013, Fiore hosted the VegEZ podcast.

Fiore is known for creating many vegetarian and vegan recipes, including millet beet burgers, dijon tempeh, tunno sandwiches, and eggplant meatballs.

References

External links 

Official website
Delicious TV's Vegan MashUp on Create TV
DeliciousTV website

Year of birth missing (living people)
Living people
American cookbook writers
American people of Italian descent
American people of German descent
American television chefs
American vegetarianism activists
Television personalities from Maine
Vegetarian cookbook writers
Women cookbook writers
Writers from Portland, Maine